Timo Salo (born June 5, 1985) is a Finnish professional ice hockey player. He currently plays for KalPa of the SM-liiga.

References

External links

Living people
KalPa players
1985 births
Finnish ice hockey forwards